Harry Bush (1925–1994) was an American artist known for his homoerotic illustrations. Bush's meticulously detailed boy next door-style depictions of men made him one of the most notable artists of the era of beefcake magazines.

Biography 
Bush served in the United States Navy and United States Air Force during the Second World War, having his first homosexual experience while deployed in the European theatre. Bush took up illustration as a pastime during the war; a self-trained artist, Bush took only one community college drawing class. Upon the conclusion of the war, he worked at the Pentagon until the early 1960s. Bush retired from military service at the age of 40, and relocated to Los Angeles, California.

In California, Bush's artwork was discovered by Bob Mizer, the founder of the Athletic Model Guild. In January 1966, Mizer published Bush's work for the first time in Physique Pictorial, making Bush the second artist after George Quaintance to be featured in the magazine. Works by Bush were additionally published in Mr. Sun, In Touch, Stroke, and Drummer. Bush, along with Lüger, is noted as being among the last of the gay artists to originate in beefcake magazines; he would continue to be published in the openly gay periodicals of the 1970s and 1980s that formed following the erosion of obscenity laws.

Bush was notoriously reclusive, and critical of what he perceived as the superficiality of the gay community. His isolation, combined with fears of copyright infringement, led him to destroy much of his original artwork. Bush remained closeted for the majority of his life due to a persistent fear that he would be outed and subsequently lose his veteran's pension; despite this, he never worked under a pseudonym, and signed all of his art with his own name.

Bush died in 1994 due to complications from emphysema. An anthology of his surviving works was published posthumously in 2007.

References

Further reading

1994 deaths
American erotic artists
Artists of the American West
American gay artists
1925 births
United States Army Air Forces personnel of World War II
United States Navy personnel of World War II
LGBT people from California
Deaths from emphysema
Infectious disease deaths in California
20th-century American LGBT people
Gay male erotica artists